The Ministry of Transport, National Infrastructure and Road Safety (MOT) is a government agency that handles transportation and road safety issues in Israel. The ministry headquarters are in Givat Ram, Jerusalem.

Functions and structure
The Ministry of Transport handles road safety; operation of traffic services; and maintaining international air, sea, and overland links. Land transport departments include the Licensing Division, Vehicles Division, Traffic Division, Road Safety Administration, and Financial Supervision Division. The Shipping and Ports Administration handles maritime transport, and the Civil Aviation Administration handles air transport. The Israel Meteorological Service covers all three areas. Units subordinate to the director-general include Planning and Economics, Legal Counsel, Public Relations, Internal Auditing, Finance, and Emergency Arrangements. The Israel Airports Authority and the Ports and Railways Authority have a special status as corporations established by law.

The Planning and Economics Division coordinates transport policy, work plans, budgets, and funding; sets policy on prices, levies, and fees; monitors the administration of the Airports Authority and the Ports and Railways Authority; coordinates information systems and transportation research; and oversees physical planning and monitoring of master plans.

Development plans
In 2010, Nir Barkat, mayor of Jerusalem, unveiled a NIS 8 billion transportation plan for the city drawn up in collaboration with the Transport Ministry. The plan includes a new light rail line, extensions of the first phase of the red line now under construction, a series of Bus Rapid Transit (BRT) routes and five new roads.

In 2021 the new minister Merav Michaeli announced a shift in focus declaring "Over the years, planning was done here from a perspective that placed private vehicles in the center. We are turning this around completely and making private vehicles the lowest priority, and as a top priority we are placing the citizens as pedestrians, so there will be as much motivation as possible to walk on foot and ride bicycles, and for it to be possible to take public transportation as much as possible, quickly and efficiently, and for it to be pleasant for us to do this."

List of ministers
The Minister of Transport, National Infrastructure and Road Safety (Sar HaTahbura, HaTashtiyot HaLe'umiyot VeHaBetihut BaDrakhim), formerly Minister of Transport, heads the ministry. A relatively minor post in the Israeli cabinet, it is often given to smaller parties in the governing coalitions. Nevertheless, there has been a Minister of Transport in every Israeli government to date. Miri Regev of the governing Likud party is the incumbent.

Three Prime Ministers (David Ben-Gurion, Menachem Begin and Ariel Sharon) have held the transport portfolio whilst in office, though only for a short time, whilst three Ministers of Transport (Ezer Weizman, Moshe Katsav and Shimon Peres) had gone on to become President.

There is also occasionally a Deputy Minister of Transport.

List of deputy ministers

References

External links

 Ministry of Transport and Road Safety
 Ministry of Transport and Road Safety 
 Ministry of Transport and Road Safety 
All Ministers in the Ministry of Transportation Knesset website

Transport
Ministry of Transport
Transport
 
Transport organizations based in Israel
Israel